Navasota hebetella is a species of snout moth in the genus Navasota. It was described by Émile Louis Ragonot in 1887 and is found in North America, including Texas.

References

Moths described in 1887
Anerastiini
Taxa named by Émile Louis Ragonot